The Evangelical Lutheran Church of Ingria (Yevangelichesko-lyuteranskaya tserkov Ingriyi; ; also the Church of Ingria) is a Lutheran church in Russia. It is the second largest Lutheran church in Russia, with 90 congregations and 15,000 members, and is mostly active in Ingria and Karelia.

History

The church was established in 1992, when it gained its indepedence from the Estonian Evangelical Lutheran Church, though the first Lutheran parish in Ingria was founded in 1611, and the church recognizes this date as the date of its original foundation.

Origins

In accordance with the Treaty of Stolbovo, the lands of Karelia and Ingria were ceded to Sweden. As a result, a significant majority of the local Russian population who lived there had left. The newly vacated lands were then settled by Savonian Finns, where they numbered in the majority for 30 years. A number of parishes were established there, the first of which was established in Lembolovo in 1611. The newly created parishes were established under the Church of Sweden, and in 1618 were incorporated into the Diocese of Turku. In 1641, a synod with a superintendent as its head was established in Narva, the synod was responsible for all matters relating to the installation of priests and the maintenance of churches.

Russian Imperial Era

By the time that the Russians had retaken Ingria in 1721 following the Great Northern War, 28 Lutheran parishes had been established.
In 1734, Empress Anna Ioannovna presented the Scandinavian-Lutheran community with a plot of land in Nevsky Prospekt, where a wooden church dedicated to Saint Anna was built. In 1767, the Church of Saint Mary in Saint Petersburg was constructed, and it became the central church for Finns in Russia. On July 20, 1819, Emperor Alexander I issued a decree for the creation of an official Evangelical-Lutheran see, to which all Lutheran parishes of the Russian Empire would be subordinate. And in January of 1820, at the invitation of Alexander I, a Finnish bishop named Zacarias Signeus from the city of Porvoo had arrived in St. Petersburg. And with the help of Archbishop Jakob Tengström of Finland, the bishop began to reorganize the church life of both St. Petersburg and throughout Russia. However, the death of Alexander I prevented the goal of reorganizing the Lutheran Church from being accomplished. In a law signed by Nicholas I on December 28, 1832, there was no mention of the historical episcopate. The Narva Synod was abolished and the role of management in the Lutheran church was occupied primarily by the Germans.

Soviet Era

In the early years of soviet rule, the attitude of the Bolsheviks towards the Finnish Church was one of tolerance, the Finns were allowed not only to organize their own church, but also to begin preaching in Russian. In January of 1919, representatives from Finnish parishes gathered in Petrograd and formed the Committee of Finnish-Ingrian Evangelical Lutheran Communities, and by the end September of the same year the Committee decided to declare the Finnish Church of Ingermanland independent, since the German committee no longer existed.

On March 3, 1921, the Russian Evangelical Lutheran Episcopal Council officially proclaimed that from now on the parishes of the Church of Ingria would form an independent synodal district with a consistory. A General Synod was organized in Moscow, which existed until 1935, until which a bishop's council was later formed. Its chairman was Probst Felix Fridolf Relander, a Finnish pastor who was consecrated bishop of Finnish Lutheran parishes in 1921.

In 1925, Felix Relander died and his duties passed to a consistory of 3 pastors and 4 laymen. One of these pastors, Selim Yalmari Laurikkala, who had previously served as the rector of the Church of Saint Regina in Vsevolozhsk, became chairman of the consistory, but was not named bishop. Under him, the parishes were led by the Ingermanland Evangelical Lutheran Main Church Council, which was organized according to a charter of 2 clergy and 5 other persons elected for 3 years.

However, this situation did not last long. On April 8, 1929, by decree of the Presidium of the All-Russian Central Executive Committee, parochial education, youth groups, and all types of social services were prohibited. From 1928 to 1935, over 18,000 Ingrians were deported to Kazakhstan, Siberia, East Karelia and the Kola Peninsula as a part of Joseph Stalin's Five Year Plan. In the spring of 1935, the NKVD was tasked with "the cleaning of the twenty-two kilometer border strip of kulak and anti-Soviet element". As a result, the Kuivozovsky Finnish National District ceased to exist - more than 1936 thousand people were expelled from it. In 1930, Ingrians were resettled in Vologda. And by the 1940s, all Ingrian parishes had been closed, pastors and the most active parishioners either had emigrated or were repressed, and churches had their properties confiscated. 68,000 Ingrians lived in the territories occupied by the Wehrmacht during World War II. In order to investigate the living conditions of the local population, a commission was created, which visited Gatchina, Pushkin, Krasnoye Selo, Tosno and Volosovo. Taking into account the opinion of the commission, in order to satisfy the spiritual hunger of the locals, in August 1942 the military chaplain Lieutenant Juhani Jaskeläinen was sent from Finland. In the spring of 1943, he was joined by pastors Jussi Tenkku and Reino Jylönen. About 20 communities began to operate again, confirmation classes were conducted, and the sacraments were performed. However, by 1943, in connection with the deportation of Ingrians to the Klooga concentration camp, the revival ended abruptly. The last service was performed by Pastor Reynaud Jylönen at St. Catherine's Church in Petrovo.

Up until the 1950s, there were secret assemblies of believers among the Ingrians, mostly led by women. In May of 1949, Matti Kukkonen, a former member of the church council in Koltushskoye, returned from exile to Petrozavodsk, who, having settled in a private house on the outskirts of the city, began on his own initiative to conduct divine services, perform the sacraments, and confirm those who wished.

In 1953, two surviving pastors, Juhani Vassel and Paavo Jaime, who as best they could, carried out the spiritual care of a small flock that had returned to their native places. They settled in Petrozavodsk. Upon their return, the spiritual life of the community of Karelia was revived. People were again able to receive the Lord's supper, to participate in confirmation training. In the summer, pastors held spiritual meetings in cemeteries because of the large number of people. Often such meetings were reported and dispersed by the police.

In 1958, the community in Petrozavodsk was visited by the Estonian Archbishop Jan Kiyvit, who gave advice on how to register the community. However, the application of the Ingrian Lutheran church to the Council for Religious Affairs under the Council of Ministers of the Soviet Union, which had 703 signatures, was rejected.

As a part of the Estonian Church (1960s-1992)

In the late 1960s, Ingrians became part of the Estonian Lutheran Church – the first service was held in the old church in Narva. It was conducted by an Estonian pastor named Elmer Kuhl, who didn't speak Finnish and therefore served via transcription, but the church, designed for 250 seats, gathered 800 people for the first service.
Further development of the Church is associated with Arvo Survo, originally a deacon at the Church of the Resurrection in Pushkin. In the late 1980s, he and his associates began the restoration of church buildings in Finnish villages, beginning with a church in the village of Gubanitsa, Volosovsky District. A total of five new churches were built and sixteen old ones were restored. In December of 1987, Archbishop Kuno Pajula of Estonia ordained Arvo Survo to the priesthood. In 1989, Arvo Survo raised the issue of creating an independent Ingermanland presbytery within the Church of Estonia, but was initially denied. 

On May 4, 1989, representatives of five Ingrian parishes signed a declaration in Gubanice on the re-establishment of the Finnish Evangelical Lutheran Church of Ingria, "completely independent in internal life", although "recognizing the authority" of the Estonian Archbishop, and formed a Board headed by A. Kuortti and A. Survo. On July 19, 1989, the parish in Koltushi was registered, on February 22, 1990, parishes in Kuzemkino, Toksovo, Skvoritsy, and Gatchina were registered. In 1990, the Church of Estonia allocated the newly established parishes to the Ingermanland presbytery, headed by Pastor Leino Hassinen, who was invited from Finland. On May 19, 1991, in Gubanice, Archbishop Pajula ordained four more pastors to serve in the Ingermanland provostship. On July 10, 1991, the Council of the Ingermanland provostship decided to establish an independent Church of Ingria. And in August of 1991, independence from the Estonian Church was proclaimed, and on January 1, 1992, with the consent of the Evangelical Lutheran Church of Estonia, the Ingermanland Provostship was transformed into an independent Evangelical Lutheran Church of Ingria. The Russian authorities registered the new church on September 14, 1992. The primate of the church was Leino Hassinen, who was consecrated a bishop in 1993.

1992-Present

In October of 1992, the Church of St. George in Kolbino, the first Ingrian church building built on the historical lands of Ingermanland after 1917, was consecrated.

On November 5, 1991, a parish in Saransk was registered - the first missionary parish in the Russian province.

In 1995, the rector of the Koltush community, Arri Kugappi, became the new bishop of the Church of Ingria. The consecration was performed by bishops Leino Hassinen, Matti Sihvonen, Vernet, Henrik Svenungsson, and Georg Kretschmar, as well as Archbishop Jaan Kiyvit.

On May 10, 2019, Arry Kugappi informed the Synodal Council of the Church of his desire to retire by age within the period established by the Charter. On October 19, 2019, at the XXX Synod of the ELCI, the rector of the Theological Institute of the Church of Ingria, the rector of the Gubanitsky parish, pastor Ivan Sergeevich Laptev, was elected the new bishop.

On February 9, 2020, at a solemn divine service in the Church of St. Mary, Pastor Ivan Sergeyevich Laptev was ordained a bishop. The ordination was performed by Bishop Emeritus Arri Kugappi, Archbishop Jānis Vanags , Vsevolod Lytkin, Tiit Salumäe, and Seppo Häkkinen.

Provostships
The church is organised in seven provostships: Western Ingria, Saint Petersburg, Karelia, Moscow, Volga, Ural, and Siberia.

See also
Evangelical Lutheran Church of Finland
Evangelical Lutheran Church in Russia, Ukraine, Kazakhstan and Central Asia
Estonian Evangelical Lutheran Church
Siberian Evangelical Lutheran Church

References

External links
Official website 

Lutheran denominations
Ingria
International Lutheran Council members
Lutheran World Federation members
Ingria